Atagema browni is a species of sea slug or dorid nudibranch, a marine gastropod mollusc in the family Discodorididae.

Distribution 
This species was described from Jamaica.

References

Discodorididae
Gastropods described in 1980